Julius Augustus Fleischmann (June 8, 1871 – February 5, 1925) was an American businessman, the long-time president of Fleischmann's Yeast, and a former mayor of Cincinnati. A bon vivant, sailor, and sportsman, he was the son of yeast magnate Charles Louis Fleischmann.

Biography 
Fleischmann was born in Cincinnati to Austria-born, Hungarian-Jewish man, Charles Louis Fleischmann and his Prussian-born wife Henriette Robertson.

Julius left college to become general manager of Fleischmann's Yeast in 1894 when he was 22 years old. He became president of the company in 1897, overseeing the company's expansion.

Among the many interests of the Fleischmann family was baseball. In 1898, Fleischman financed the semiprofessional baseball team, the Cincinnati Shamrocks, which included the future Hall of Fame manager Miller Huggins. In 1900, Huggins played for Fleischmann's semiprofessional team based in the Catskill Mountains, the Mountain Tourists. In 1903 Fleischmann was part of a syndicate the purchased the Philadelphia Phillies. Julius Fleischmann was also involved in thoroughbred horses, along with his father and his brother Max, under the name Charles Fleischmann and Sons.

He became Cincinnati's youngest mayor in 1900 aged 28. He was re-elected once, and served until 1905. Under his mayorship, Cincinnati's police force became known as one of the best in the nation. As mayor, Fleischmann promoted education, created public parks, and supported continued investment in local railroad lines. A staunch Republican, Fleischmann later served three times as a delegate to the Republican National Convention.

In May 1914, Fleischmann gave Fleischmanns Park to the village of Fleischmanns, New York. The park, which dominated the north side of Wagner Avenue in Fleischmanns, was formerly known as the Mountain Athletic Club. It was where the town's semiprofessional baseball players came to get in shape before the start of the regular season. (One of the town's players was the future Hall of Famer Honus Wagner.) Stipulations of Julius' gift were that it always be used as a park and athletic grounds, that it always be kept in good condition, that it never be sold or sublet, and always be of free access to the public.

Fleischmann was initiated as a national honorary member of Phi Mu Alpha Sinfonia fraternity in 1914.

He died of heart disease on February 5, 1925, while playing polo in Miami.

Personal life and family
Fleischmann was married two times, to Lily Ackerland from 1893 to 1920, with whom he had three children; Laura G. Hemingway from 1920 −1924.

His son Julius Fleischmann, Jr. (1900–1968) was among other things a philanthropist who founded World Art, Inc. (directed by Serge Denham), an organization devoted to sponsoring cultural organizations. In 1937, World Art financed the Ballet Russe de Monte Carlo, which launched its first season in 1938.

His daughter, Mrs. Henry C. Yeiser, took out a then-record $3.25 million insurance policy against her inheritance.

References

External links

1871 births
1925 deaths
Mayors of Cincinnati
American people of Prussian descent
American people of Hungarian-Jewish descent
Ohio Republicans
Philadelphia Phillies owners